The Main Street Historic District is a historic district encompassing a portion of the 19th century industrial village center of Millville, Massachusetts.   This district covers a large portion of the village, along Main Street south of Central Street, and along Lincoln Street and Chestnut Hill Road radiating away from Central Street.  Other historical portions of the village are contained within the Central Street Historic District.  This district was listed on the National Register of Historic Places in 2006.

See also
 National Register of Historic Places listings in Worcester County, Massachusetts

References

Historic districts in Worcester County, Massachusetts
Millville, Massachusetts
National Register of Historic Places in Worcester County, Massachusetts
Historic districts on the National Register of Historic Places in Massachusetts